Jesús Colomé de la Cruz (born December 23, 1977) is a former professional relief pitcher. He played for the Tampa Bay Devil Rays, Washington Nationals, Milwaukee Brewers and Seattle Mariners of Major League Baseball (MLB).

Professional career

Oakland Athletics
Jesús Colomé was signed as a non-drafted free agent by the Oakland Athletics at age 18, in 1996. He had made it to Double-A as a starting pitcher when, on July 28, 2000, he was traded to the Tampa Bay Devil Rays for Todd Belitz and Jim Mecir.

Tampa Bay Devil Rays
The Devil Rays converted him to a relief pitcher, and he made his major league debut with them on June 21, 2001. He finished with a 3.33 ERA. Colomé was one of the only pitchers to throw over 100 mph, but he had bad control. The next season, he posted an 8.27 ERA (the highest of his career). He returned to his old form in 2004, in 2003 he struck out a career high 69 batters.

On August 26, 2005, Colomé was involved in a serious car accident in the Dominican Republic. Two months later, he was released by the Devil Rays.

New York Yankees
Colomé signed a minor league contract with the New York Yankees in 2006. At the end of the season, spent entirely in the minors, he opted for free agency.

Washington Nationals
Colomé then signed with the Washington Nationals. He came north with the Nationals following the spring season and started off pitching well. By Memorial Day he was 4–0, and was fifth in the league with 26 appearances, posting a 2.20 ERA and prompting MLB writer Bill Ladson to write, "Jesús Colomé is the Nationals' best reliever, and one could argue that he should be considered for the All-Star Game." Ladson credited Colome's resurgence in his reliance on pitches other than his once dominating fastball.

On December 10, 2008, he was released by the Nationals. He was re-signed by the Nationals to a minor league contract on January 15, 2009. He competed for a spot on the Nationals' roster in spring training, but was sent to the minor leagues on April 4, 2009.

Milwaukee Brewers
In July 2009, the Nationals designated him for assignment and he was picked up by the Milwaukee Brewers and signed to a minor league contract. On September 6, he was released by the Brewers.

Seattle Mariners
On February 10, 2010, Colome signed a minor league contract with the Seattle Mariners.  Colomé and Kanekoa Texeira were designated for assignment on May 31, 2010, to make room for Sean White and Garrett Olson.

Los Angeles Dodgers
He was signed to a minor league contract by the Los Angeles Dodgers on June 23, 2010, and assigned to the AAA Albuquerque Isotopes. He only appeared in 3 games for the Isotopes before he was released.

Texas Rangers
On August 15, 2010, he, along with Willy Taveras, signed a minor league deal with the Texas Rangers, and was assigned to Triple-A Oklahoma City.

Colorado Rockies
Colomé signed a minor league deal with the Rockies in 2011. He only appeared in 10 games for their AAA affiliate team.

Sultanes de Monterrey
He played for the Sultanes de Monterrey in the Mexican League in 2012.

Joplin Blasters
Colome signed with the Joplin Blasters of the American Association of Independent Professional Baseball and played for them during the 2015 season.

Personal life
His nephew is Álex Colomé.

References

External links

1977 births
Living people
Albuquerque Isotopes players
Arizona League Athletics players
Bridgeport Bluefish players
Cardenales de Lara players
Caribes de Anzoátegui players
Colorado Springs Sky Sox players
Columbus Clippers players
Dominican Republic expatriate baseball players in Mexico
Dominican Republic expatriate baseball players in the United States
Durham Bulls players
Estrellas Orientales players
Gigantes del Cibao players
Gulf Coast Nationals players
Joplin Blasters players
Major League Baseball pitchers
Major League Baseball players from the Dominican Republic
Mexican League baseball pitchers
Midland RockHounds players
Milwaukee Brewers players
Modesto A's players
Montgomery Biscuits players
Nashville Sounds players
Oklahoma City RedHawks players
Orlando Rays players
Sportspeople from San Pedro de Macorís
Seattle Mariners players
Sultanes de Monterrey players
Syracuse Chiefs players
Tampa Bay Devil Rays players
Tigres del Licey players
Trenton Thunder players
Washington Nationals players
Yaquis de Obregón players
Dominican Republic expatriate baseball players in Venezuela